Inner Ring Road may refer to:

Roads

China
Inner Ring Road (Shanghai)
Inner Ring Road (Tianjin)
Inner Ring Road, Guangzhou

Germany
Inner Ring Road, Berlin
Inner City Ring Road (Leipzig)

Greece
Thessaloniki Inner Ring Road

India
Inner Ring Road, Bangalore
Inner Ring Road, Chennai
Inner Ring Road, Delhi
Inner Ring Road, Guntur
Inner Ring Road, Hyderabad
Inner Ring Road, Vijayawada

Indonesia
Jakarta Inner Ring Road

United Kingdom
Glasgow Inner Ring Road
Inner Ring Road, London
Leeds Inner Ring Road
Manchester Inner Ring Road
 Sheffield Inner Ring Road

Malaysia
George Town Inner Ring Road
Johor Bahru Inner Ring Road
Kluang Inner Ring Road
Kuala Lumpur Inner Ring Road
Segamat Inner Ring Road
Seremban Inner Ring Road